The 2019 Indian Ocean Island Games, officially known as Jeux des îles de l'océan Indien Maurice 2019 or simply JIOI Maurice 2019, is the 10th edition of this multi-sport event for athletes representing the National Olympic Committees of Indian Ocean island nations. It was held in Mauritius from July 19 – 28, 2019.

Organisation

Venues

The Games

Participating IOCs
Over 2,000 athletes, from 7 countries, participated in the 2019 Indian Ocean Island Games.

Sports
A total of 14 sports were represented in the 2019 Indian Ocean Island Games.

  Athletics (62)
  Badminton (5)
  Basketball (2)
  Boxing (10)
  Cycling (3)
  Football (1)
  Weightlifting (15)
  Judo (24)
  Sailing (9)
  Swimming (20)
  Table tennis (14)
 Volleyball
  Beach (2)
  Indoor (2)
  Rugby (1)

Medal table

References

External links 

 Official website

Indian Ocean Island Games
Indian Ocean Island Games
Indian Ocean Island Games